Tun Hussein Onn University of Malaysia (abbreviated as UTHM) is a public university in Batu Pahat, Johor, Malaysia. It was formerly known as Institut Teknologi Tun Hussein Onn (ITTHO) and Kolej Universiti Teknologi Tun Hussein Onn (KUiTTHO). Along with other public university colleges, KUiTTHO was promoted to full university status since year 2007. The name UTHM was officially launched by the then education minister, Dato' Seri Hishammuddin Bin Tun Hussein.

UTHM is also a member of Malaysian Technical University Network (MTUN).

History

Establishment
The establishment history of Universiti Tun Hussein Onn Malaysia started off on 16 September 1993. The university was formerly known as Pusat Latihan  Politeknik (PLSP). The core business of PLSP then was to train and produce polytechnics academic staff in various engineering fields. The training institute was jointly administered by Universiti Teknologi Malaysia and the Ministry of Education Malaysia.

Three years later, PLSP was upgraded to Institut Teknologi Tun Hussein Onn (ITTHO). Dato’ Sri Mohd Najib bin Tun Abdul Razak who was then the Minister of Education made the official announcement of the new status on 12 April 1996. This promotion is an acknowledgment to the institution that has excelled in producing human resources for technical education.

On 27 September 2000, the institute achieved another milestone when the Malaysian government agreed to award a university-college status to the institute. This was to recognise its contributions in science and technology-based development as well as in helping the nation to achieve its aspiration. With the new status, the institution was known as Kolej Universiti Teknologi Tun Hussein Onn (KUiTTHO) and the official announcement was made by Tan Sri Dato’ Seri Musa bin Mohamed, the then Minister of Education.

The Malaysian government, on 20 September 2006, agreed to award the university-college a full university status and changed its name to Universiti Tun Hussein Onn Malaysia. On 1 February 2007, Datuk Mustapha Mohamed, the Minister of Higher Education officially announced the change of status. Subsequently, Dato’ Seri Hishamuddin Tun Hussein Onn then made the official declaration of the change of name on 2 March 2007.

Changes of names
 Pusat Latihan  Politeknik (PLSP) - 1993
 Institut Teknologi Tun Hussein Onn (ITTHO) - 1996
 Kolej Universiti Teknologi Tun Hussein Onn (KUiTTHO) - 2000
 Universiti Tun Hussein Onn Malaysia (UTHM) - 2007

Faculty
There are eight faculties and three academic centres as follows.
 Faculty of Civil Engineering and Built Environment (formerly known as Faculty of Civil and Environmental Engineering
 Faculty of Electrical and Electronic Engineering
 Faculty of Mechanical and Manufacturing Engineering
 Faculty of Technical and Vocational Education
 Faculty of Technology Management and Business
 Faculty of Computer Science and Information Technology
 Faculty of Applied Science and Technology
 Faculty of Technology Engineering
 Centre for Graduate Studies
 Centre for Diploma Studies
 Continuing Education Centre
 Centre for Language Studies
 Centre for General Studies of Co-curricular
 Centre for APEL

Programs offered
The programmes offered by UTHM are as follows.

Diploma programs
Diploma level of studies are offered to applicants with SPM or equivalent certification.

Degree programs
Degree level of studies are offered to applicants with STPM/STAM / Matriculation / diploma / equivalent certification.

Postgraduate programs
UTHM offers Doctor of Philosophy and Master's degree (by research and by coursework) programs on a full-time and part-time basis.

Offshore programs
UTHM offshore programs are offered at UTHM campuses in Kota Bharu, Arau, Jitra, Kuantan, Kuching, Kota Kinabalu, Beranang and Dungun. For the time being, programs offered are only at master's degree level.

Executive programs
These programs are designed for working people at mid-career professionals from the public sector, international organisations, business and civil society organisations. The Executive Programs are organised on a flexible, credit-accumulation basis that can be completed  within 6 months or more. Programs are offered in full-time as well as part-time modes.

Short courses
Short courses programs are designed to enhance applicants knowledge and skill  from introductory to advanced levels.

Residential colleges
At UTHM, hostels for students are called "Kolej Kediaman" ("residential college"), or "KK". This term was first used when the institution received its "university" title. The former term was "desasiswa" ("hostel"). Prior to 2022, there are eight separate residential colleges. However, as of 2022 the residential colleges have been reorganised as follows.
 KK Dalam Kampus Parit Raja
 KK Luar Kampus Parit Raja
 KK Kampus Pagoh

Tunku Tun Aminah Library

The Tunku Tun Aminah Library is one of the largest academic libraries in Malaysia. The building has four floors, with 16,000 square meters of total floor area. It can accommodate as many as 300,000 books and 3,000 users.

The library has 100 carrel rooms, 40 discussion rooms, 2 seminar rooms, a postgraduate research room, an auditorium, a closed reference room, a journal room and a 24-hour reading room. It provides a variety reference sources including printed and electronic material, especially in the areas of civil engineering, electrical engineering, mechanical engineering, information technology, education, science, social sciences, management and languages. The library has more than 200,000 books, 10,000 titles of these, 40 titles of printed journals, 380 titles of e-journals, 50 titles of magazines, and 22,000 items of audio-visual material. The library also subscribes to 26 online databases services with access to more than 120,000 journal titles and 4 e-books services giving access to 80,000 titles of books.

The library initiated an automation project in 1997. Currently, the library is using the SirsiDynix Symphony integrated library system to manage its operations, automate tasks and improve staff productivity.

Rankings

See also
 List of universities in Malaysia

References

External links

 Universiti Tun Hussein Onn Malaysia official website
 Tunku Tun Aminah Library official website
 List of Malaysia Public University, Ministry of Higher Education, Malaysia
 Official website - IPTA application
   UTHM Campus Pagoh

Batu Pahat District
Universities and colleges in Johor
Public universities in Malaysia
Educational institutions established in 1993
Technical universities and colleges in Malaysia
Engineering universities and colleges in Malaysia
Information technology schools in Malaysia
1993 establishments in Malaysia